Qing Lan is a Chinese physician-scientist and molecular epidemiologist who researches indoor air pollution, lung cancer, and occupational exposures. She is a senior investigator in the occupational and environmental epidemiology branch at the National Cancer Institute.

Life 
Lan earned a M.D. from the Weifang Medical University in 1985. In 2001, she completed a Ph.D. in molecular epidemiology at the Chinese Academy of Preventive Medicine, as part of a joint training program with the U.S. Environmental Protection Agency and the University of North Carolina at Chapel Hill. Lan earned a M.P.H. at the Johns Hopkins Bloomberg School of Public Health.

Lan was awarded National Institutes of Health (NIH) scientific tenure in 2008. She uses classic epidemiologic methods, exposure assessment approaches, and biomarker platforms to evaluate relationships between exposures and cancer, and to obtain mechanistic insight. Lan is a senior investigator in the occupational and environmental epidemiology branch at the National Cancer Institute (NCI). Her research focuses on the molecular epidemiology of indoor air pollution and lung cancer and occupational exposures to known or suspected carcinogens, as well as the etiology of hematopoietic malignancies. She has conducted molecular epidemiologic studies of populations exposed to well-defined classes of chemical compounds that are known or suspected carcinogens, including polycyclic aromatic hydrocarbons (PAHs), benzene, formaldehyde, trichloroethylene, diesel, carbon black, nanoparticles, and others. Lan and her colleagues apply "omic" technologies in their studies including metabolomics, genomics, epigenetics, transcriptomics, proteomics, and whole genome sequencing, as well as conduct genome-wide association studies (GWAS).

References 

Living people
Place of birth missing (living people)
Year of birth missing (living people)
University of North Carolina at Chapel Hill alumni
Johns Hopkins Bloomberg School of Public Health alumni
National Institutes of Health people
20th-century Chinese women scientists
20th-century women physicians
Chinese women physicians
21st-century Chinese women scientists
21st-century women physicians
Physician-scientists
Chinese epidemiologists
Women epidemiologists
Cancer epidemiologists